Towyn power station was a combined oil engine and hydro-electric generating station in Wales. It provided electricity to the towns of Towyn (Tywyn) and Aberdovey (Aberdyfi) and the surrounding district from the 1930s to the 1960s.

History 
Towyn, Aberdovey and District Electricity Company Limited built a combined oil engine and water-turbine electricity generating plant at Happy Valley Towyn. Upon the nationalisation of the British electricity supply industry in 1948 the Towyn power station was vested in the British Electricity Authority. The power station was decommissioned in the 1960s.

Power station owners 
The owners of the power station over its operational life were: Towyn, Aberdovey and District Electricity Company Limited (until 1948), British Electricity Authority (1948–55), Central Electricity Authority (1955–57), Central Electricity Generating Board (from 1958).

Plant and equipment 
The plant at Towyn power station comprised:

 5 × 183 kW oil engine sets, total capacity of 916 kW
 1 × 34 kW water turbine set

The total generating capacity was 950 kW, the generating sets operated at 380, 400 and 420 V.

 In December 1951 a 400 kW English Electric diesel engine set was transferred from Aberystwyth power station.

Operations 
The operating conditions and electricity output of Towyn power station were:

See also 

 Timeline of the UK electricity supply industry
 List of power stations in Wales
 Hydroelectricity in the United Kingdom

References 

Hydroelectric power stations in Wales
Tywyn